Marshall County is a county in the northwestern part of the U.S. state of Minnesota. As of the 2020 census, the population was 9,040. Its county seat is Warren.

Marshall County was the location of a claimed UFO incident in 1979, the Val Johnson incident.

History
The Minnesota legislature created the county on February 25, 1879, with territory partitioned from the southern half of Kittson County, with Warren (which was first platted that same year) as the county seat. It was named for William Rainey Marshall, who served as Minnesota governor from 1866 to 1870.

Geography
Marshall County lies on Minnesota's border with North Dakota (across the Red River, which flows north along the county's western border). The Snake River rises in Polk County and flows north through the western part of the county to its confluence with the Red. The Tamarac River rises in Marshall County and flows west through the county's northern area to its confluence with the Red. The Middle River also rises in Marshall County and flows west through the southern part of the county, discharging into the Snake just upstream of the Snake/Red confluence. The county terrain consists of low rolling hills, carved with drainages, completely devoted to agriculture where possible. The terrain slopes to the west and north, with its highest point near the midpoint of its eastern border, at 1,194' (364m) ASL. Marshall is one of 17 Minnesota savanna region counties where savanna soils predominate. The true highpoint is in the northeast of the county and caltopo displays 1237 ft at 48.5339°N, -96.0167°W

Major highways

  U.S. Highway 59
  U.S. Highway 75
  Minnesota State Highway 1
  Minnesota State Highway 32
  Minnesota State Highway 89
  Minnesota State Highway 219
  Minnesota State Highway 220
  Minnesota State Highway 317

Airports
 Stephen Municipal Airport (D41) - northeast of Stephen

Adjacent counties

 Kittson County - north
 Roseau County - northeast
 Beltrami County - east
 Pennington County - southeast
 Polk County - south
 Grand Forks County, North Dakota - southwest
 Walsh County, North Dakota - west
 Pembina County, North Dakota - northwest

Protected areas

 Agassiz National Wildlife Refuge
 Agassiz Wilderness
 Florian Park
 Florian State Wildlife Management Area
 Old Mill State Park

Lakes
 Thief Lake
 Webster Creek Pool

Demographics

2000 census
As of the 2000 census, there were 10,155 people, 4,101 households and 2,837 families in the county. The population density was 5.72/sqmi (2.21/km2). There were 4,791 housing units at an average density of 2.70/sqmi (1.04/km2). The racial makeup of the county was 97.22% White, 0.10% Black or African American, 0.29% Native American, 0.17% Asian, 1.62% from other races, and 0.60% from two or more races. 2.93% of the population were Hispanic or Latino of any race. 43.2% were of Norwegian, 12.1% Polish, 11.7% German and 9.6% Swedish ancestry.

There were 4,101 households, of which 30.20% had children under the age of 18 living with them, 60.20% were married couples living together, 5.40% had a female householder with no husband present, and 30.80% were non-families. 28.70% of all households were made up of individuals, and 15.10% had someone living alone who was 65 years of age or older. The average household size was 2.45 and the average family size was 3.01.

The county population contained 25.40% under the age of 18, 6.70% from 18 to 24, 24.70% from 25 to 44, 24.70% from 45 to 64, and 18.50% who were 65 years of age or older. The median age was 40 years. For every 100 females there were 103.20 males. For every 100 females age 18 and over, there were 102.10 males.

The median household income was $34,804, and the median family income was $41,908. Males had a median income of $30,051 versus $20,600 for females. The per capita income for the county was $16,317. About 6.90% of families and 9.80% of the population were below the poverty line, including 11.30% of those under age 18 and 12.80% of those age 65 or over.

2020 Census

Communities

Cities

 Alvarado
 Argyle
 Grygla
 Holt
 Middle River
 Newfolden
 Oslo
 Stephen
 Strandquist
 Viking
 Warren (county seat)

Unincorporated communities

 Big Woods
 Englund
 Espelie
 Florian
 Gatzke
 Luna
 March
 Radium
 Rosewood

Townships

 Agder Township
 Alma Township
 Augsburg Township
 Big Woods Township
 Bloomer Township
 Boxville Township
 Cedar Township
 Como Township
 Comstock Township
 Donnelly Township
 Eagle Point Township
 East Park Township
 East Valley Township
 Eckvoll Township
 Espelie Township
 Excel Township
 Foldahl Township
 Fork Township
 Grand Plain Township
 Holt Township
 Huntly Township
 Lincoln Township
 Linsell Township
 Marsh Grove Township
 McCrea Township
 Middle River Township
 Moose River Township
 Moylan Township
 Nelson Park Township
 New Folden Township
 New Maine Township
 New Solum Township
 Oak Park Township
 Parker Township
 Rollis Township
 Sinnott Township
 Spruce Valley Township
 Tamarac Township
 Thief Lake Township
 Valley Township
 Vega Township
 Veldt Township
 Viking Township
 Wanger Township
 Warrenton Township
 West Valley Township
 Whiteford Township
 Wright Township

Unorganized territory
 Mud Lake

Government and politics
Marshall County has voted Republican in presidential elections since 2000, except in 2008, when Barack Obama won the county by less than one percentage point.

See also 
National Register of Historic Places listings in Marshall County, Minnesota
Agassiz National Wildlife Refuge

References

 
Minnesota counties
1879 establishments in Minnesota
Populated places established in 1879